Charles Henry Bouverie (1782 – 27 May 1836), of Betchworth House, Surrey was an English politician.

Bouverie was born in 1782 the son of William Henry Bouverie who was a Member of Parliament for Salisbury.

He was a Member (MP) of the Parliament of England for Dorchester 1811 to 1812 and Downton from 1812 to 1813.

Bouverie died on 27 May 1836 in Wimbledon.

References

1782 births
1836 deaths
People from Surrey
Members of the Parliament of the United Kingdom for English constituencies
UK MPs 1807–1812
UK MPs 1812–1818